Limewater is the common name for a saturated aqueous solution of calcium hydroxide. Calcium hydroxide, Ca(OH)2, is sparsely soluble at room temperature in water (1.5 g/L at 25 °C). "Pure" (i.e. less than or fully saturated) limewater is clear and colorless, with a slight earthy smell and an astringent/bitter taste. It is basic in nature with a pH of 12.4.

Limewater may be prepared by mixing calcium hydroxide (Ca(OH)2) with water and removing excess undissolved solute (e.g. by filtration). When excess calcium hydroxide is added (or when environmental conditions are altered, e.g. when its temperature is raised sufficiently), a milky solution results due to the homogeneous suspension of excess calcium hydroxide. This liquid has been known traditionally as milk of lime.

Chemistry
An experiment commonly used to demonstrate the interaction of CO2 and Ca(OH)2 is as follows.  

Resultant carbon dioxide passed through limewater in the right tube, producing a milky solution due to precipitation of the insoluble suspension of calcium carbonate:

 Ca(OH)2 + CO2 → CaCO3 + H2O

If excess CO2 is added: the following reaction takes place:

 CaCO3 + H2O + CO2 → Ca(HCO3)2

The milkiness disappears since calcium bicarbonate is water-soluble.

Applications
The above chemical properties are commonly used for testing the presence of carbon dioxide in gaseous samples in school laboratories, and refining of sugar in a process called carbonatation.

Industry
Waste gases from industries containing sulphur dioxide can be cleaned by bubbling through limewater, a process called sulfation, in which the toxic sulphur dioxide is trapped as a precipitate:

 Ca(OH)2 + SO2 → CaSO3 + H2O

Water treatment

Limewater is used in a process known as lime softening to reduce water hardness.  It is also used as a neutralizing agent in municipal waste water treatment.

Arts
In buon fresco painting, limewater is used as the colour solvent to apply on fresh plaster. Historically, it is known as the paint whitewash.

Personal care and adornment 
Treating one's hair with limewater causes it to stiffen and bleach, with the added benefit of killing any lice or mites living there. Diodorus Siculus described the Celts as follows:
"Their aspect is terrifying... They are very tall in stature, with rippling muscles under clear white skin. Their hair is blond, but not only naturally so: they bleach it, to this day, artificially, washing it in lime and combing it back from their foreheads. They look like wood-demons, their hair thick and shaggy like a horse's mane. Some of them are clean-shaven, but others – especially those of high rank, shave their cheeks but leave a moustache that covers the whole mouth...".

Food preparation 
Limewater is used in the preparation of maize for corn tortillas and other culinary purposes using a process known as nixtamalization. Nixtamalization makes the niacin nutritionally available and prevents pellagra. Traditionally lime water was used in Taiwan and China to preserve persimmon and to remove astringency.

Other uses
Limewater is widely used by marine aquarists as a primary supplement of calcium and alkalinity for reef aquariums. Corals of order Scleractinia build their endoskeletons from aragonite (a polymorph of calcium carbonate). When used for this purpose, limewater is usually referred to as Kalkwasser. It is also used in tanning and making parchment. The lime is used as a dehairing agent based on its alkaline properties.

Calcium hydroxide is also applied in a leather process called liming.

References 

Calcium compounds
Hydroxides
Chemical tests